Barbara Radziwiłłówna is a Polish historical film. It was released in 1936. It was the first feature film transmitted by Polish television during its test phase (26 August 1939).

Cast 
 Jadwiga Smosarska – Barbara Radziwiłł
 Witold Zacharewicz – Zygmunt August
 Leokadia Pancewiczowa – queen Bona Sforza
 Lena Żelichowska – royal favourite
 Jan Kurnakowicz – stolnik Kieżgajłło
 Helena Sulimowa – Barbara Kola, Barbara's mother
 Gustaw Buszyński – Mikołaj "the Red" Radziwiłł
 Zygmunt Chmielewski – Mikołaj "the Black" Radziwiłł
 Franciszek Dominiak – Piotr Kmita, Grand Marshal of the Crown
 Stefan Hnydziński – Wirszyłł
 Jan Hajduga – astrologist
 Janusz Ziejewski – Dowoyna
 Helena Buczyńska – Barbara's aunt
 Seweryna Broniszówna – the witch
 Jerzy Chodecki – Stańczyk, the court jester
 Ludwik Fritsche – French diplomat
 Artur Kwiatkowski – Samuel Maciejowski, bishop of Chełm
 Jerzy Leszczyński – Rafał Leszczyński, starost of Radziejów and voivode of Brześć Kujawski
 Leon Łuszczewski – doctor Aliphio, chancellor of Isabella of Portugal, wife of Charles V
 Józef Maliszewski – primate Mikołaj Dzierzgowski
 Z. Protasiewicz – Bálint Bakfark, court musician
 Artur Socha – Andrzej I Górka, starost of Wielkopolska
 Ludwik Sempoliński
 Henryk Małkowski
 Michał Halicz
 Kazimierz Opaliński
 Aleksander Maniecki

References

External links
 

1936 films
Polish historical drama films
1930s Polish-language films
Polish black-and-white films
1930s historical drama films
1936 drama films